George Hedworth Darwin (16 May 1932 – June 2019) was an English professional footballer who played as an inside forward.

Career
Born in Chester-le-Street, Darwin played for Kimblesworth Juniors, Huddersfield Town, Mansfield Town, Derby County, Rotherham United, Barrow and Boston.

References

1932 births
2019 deaths
English footballers
Huddersfield Town A.F.C. players
Mansfield Town F.C. players
Derby County F.C. players
Rotherham United F.C. players
Barrow A.F.C. players
Boston Town F.C. players
English Football League players
Association football inside forwards